Cytochrome C1 (also known as Complex III subunit 4) is a protein encoded by the CYC1 gene. Cytochrome is a heme-containing subunit of the cytochrome b-c1 complex, which accepts electrons from Rieske protein and transfers electrons to cytochrome c in the mitochondrial respiratory chain. It is formed in the cytosol and targeted to the mitochondrial intermembrane space. Cytochrome c1 belongs to the cytochrome c family of proteins.

Function 
Cytochrome C1 plays a role in the electron transfer during oxidative phosphorylation. As an iron-sulfur protein approaches the b-c1 complex, it accepts an electron from the cytochrome b subunit, then undergoes a conformational change to attach to cytochrome c1. There, the electron carried by the iron-sulfur protein is transferred to the heme carried by cytochrome c1. This electron is then transferred to a heme carried by cytochrome c. This creates a reduced species of cytochrome c, which separates from the b-c1 complex and moves to the last enzyme in the electron transport chain, cytochrome c oxidase (Complex IV).

Species 
CYC1 is a human gene that is conserved in chimpanzee, Rhesus monkey, dog, cow, mouse, rat, zebrafish, fruit fly, mosquito, C. elegans, S. cerevisiae, K. lactis, E. gossypii, S. pombe, N. crassa, A. thaliana, rice, and frog. There are orthologs of CYC1 in 137 known organisms.

In its structure and function, the cytochrome b-c1 complex bears extensive analogy to the cytochrome b6f complex of chloroplasts and cyanobacteria; cytochrome c1 plays an analogous role to cytochrome f, despite their different structures.

Clinical relevance 
Mutations in the CYC1 gene are associated with mitochondrial complex III deficiency nuclear type 6. The disease symptoms include early childhood onset of severe lactic acidosis and ketoacidosis, usually in response to infection. Insulin-responsive hyperglycemia is also present, but psychomotor development appears normal. Mutation of CYC1 was observed to cause instability in the cytochrome b-c1 complex, which decreased its ability to create energy through oxidative phosphorylation. Mitochondrial complex III deficiency nuclear type 6 is autosomal recessive.

References

External links 
 

Transmembrane proteins
Cellular respiration